is a railway station in the city of Aomori in Aomori Prefecture, Japan. The station has been operating since September 1891, though the most recent station building, which consists of three island platforms connected to the station building by a footbridge, was completed in March 2021. Since 1987 the station has been used by the East Japan Railway Company (JR East) which operates various services to destinations throughout the Tōhoku region. Since 2010 the station's operations have been jointly run by JR East and the Aoimori Railway Company, a third sector, regional rail operator.

Location
Aomori Station is located at the western terminus of Aomori Prefecture Route 16, a  road that provides access to the station from Japan National Route 4 in central Aomori. The station is situated within the urban core of central Aomori and is in close proximity to the city hall, prefectural hall, the city library, and several landmarks and museums including the Aomori Bay Bridge, A-Factory, and Nebuta Museum Wa Rasse. Aomori Station is the northern terminus of the Ōu Main Line and the Aoimori Railway Line and the southern terminus of the Tsugaru Line. The stations adjacent to it along those lines, respectively, are Shin-Aomori Station, Tsutsui Station, and Aburakawa Station.

Station layout
Aomori Station has three island platforms connected to the station building by a footbridge. The station has a "Midori no Madoguchi" staffed ticket office, a convenience store, and a View Plaza travel agency. The station's two ticket offices for JR East and the Aoimori Railway Company are attended from 5:20 am to 10:30 pm each day, while the View Plaza agency is attended from 10:00 am to 5:30 pm daily. Tickets can also be purchased at two separate automatic dispensers for JR East and the Aoimori Railway Company. A second footbridge added during the station's reconfiguration in March 2021 connects the areas to the east and west of the station, allowing pedestrians to cross over the station's platforms without purchasing a ticket.

Platforms

History
The station opened on 1 September 1891 as the northern terminus of the Ueno–Aomori line of the Nippon Railway. It became a station on the Tōhoku Main Line of the Japanese Government Railways (JGR), the pre-war predecessor to the Japan National Railways (JNR), after the nationalization of the Nippon Railway on 1 November 1906. The station and its adjacent port facilities were destroyed during strategic bombing of Aomori in World War II on 28 July 1945. Kominato Station in Hiranai picked up the destroyed station's role as the terminal station of the Tōhoku Main Line until the reconstruction of Aomori Station was completed on 15 July 1949. The temporary structure built after the war was replaced in 1959 with the station building that was used until March 2021.

With the privatization of Japanese National Railways (JNR) on 1 April 1987, the station came under the control of JR East. On 4 December 2010, the Tōhoku Shinkansen was successfully extended north to Shin-Aomori Station from Hachinohe. As a result of the opening of the bullet train between the two stations, that section of the Tōhoku Main Line including the line's platforms at Aomori Station was transferred to the Aoimori Railway Company from JR East on the same day. 

In October 2018 construction commenced on the fifth iteration of the Aomori Station building with improved access to the station's western entrance. On 27 March 2021, the fourth-generation station building was closed following the opening of the fifth-generation station building and the conclusion of celebratory festivities in the older building. Following the movement of station operations, the area occupied by the older building is slated to be replaced with commercial space operated by the city of Aomori and JR East as well as a hotel that overlooks the station platforms. The multi-use, ten-story building is set to completed in 2024.

Services

Aomori Station is served by the Ōu Main Line and the Tsugaru Line of JR East. It is also served by the regional Aoimori Railway Line. The Tsugaru-Kaikyō Line formerly served Aomori Station as a connection to Hakodate in Hokkaido via the Seikan Tunnel; however, with the opening of the Hokkaido Shinkansen, conventional rail passenger services between Aomori and Hakodate have since been discontinued.

Aoimori Railway services
Passenger trains serve Aomori Station just over 18 hours a day from 5:41am to 11:54pm. At peak hours between the first train and 9:39am, trains depart from the station roughly every 30 minutes; otherwise trains depart at an approximate hourly basis.

Limited express train services
The following limited express services stop at Aomori Station:
 Tsugaru (Akita - Aomori)

Former services
The following Limited express services used to stop at Aomori Station:
 Hakuchō / Super Hakuchō (Shin-Aomori - Hakodate via Aomori)

The following overnight sleeping car services also used to operate to and from Aomori Station.
 Akebono (Ueno - Aomori)
 Nihonkai ( - Aomori)

Bus services

Buses serving the station are operated by the following operators. 
 Aomori City Bus
 Kōnan Bus Company
 JR Bus Tōhoku
 Towada Kankō Electric Railway

Highway buses
 Asunaro; For Namioka, Kuroishi, Kosaka, and Morioka Station
 Blue City; For Sendai Station
 Sky; For Ueno Station
 Panda; For Ueno Station
 Enburi; For Shinjuku Station and Tokyo Station
 Tsugaru; For Shinjuku Station and Tokyo Station
 Dream Aomori–Tokyo; For Tokyo Station and Tokyo Disneyland

Passenger statistics
In fiscal 2016, the JR East portion of the station was used by an average of 5,342 passengers daily (boarding passengers only).

In popular culture
Aomori Station is the setting for the 1977 enka song by Sayuri Ishikawa "Tsugaru Kaikyō Fuyugeshiki". The song is about a young woman who has left a lover behind in Tokyo and is thinking back on them as she disembarks from a train at the station and prepares to board a ferry boat to Hokkaido.

See also
List of railway stations in Japan

References

External links

 JR East station information 
 Aoimori Railway station information 

Aomori Station
Ōu Main Line
Tōhoku Main Line
Tsugaru-Kaikyō Line
Aomori (city)
Railway stations in Japan opened in 1891